Unión Fuerza Minera is a Peruvian football club, playing in the city of Putina, Puno, Peru.

History
In the 2010 Copa Perú, the club classified to the Regional Stage, but was eliminated by José María Arguedas and Real Garcilaso.

In the 2013 Copa Perú, the club classified to the National Stage, but was eliminated by Saetas de Oro in the Round of 16.

In the 2014 Copa Perú, the club classified to the National Stage, but was defeated by Sport Loreto in the Final.

In 2015, the club withdrew from participating in the 2015 Segunda División due to financial problems.

In the 2022 Copa Perú, the club classified to the Departamental Stage, but the club withdrew from participating due to financial problems.

Honours

National
Copa Perú:
Runner-up (1): 2014

Regional
Región VIII:
Winners (1): 2014

Liga Departamental de Puno:
Winners (2): 2015, 2016
Runner-up (3): 2010, 2013, 2014

Liga Superior de Puno:
Winners (1): 2010

Liga Provincial de San Antonio de Putina:
Winners (8): 2013, 2014, 2015, 2016, 2017, 2018, 2019, 2022

See also
List of football clubs in Peru
Peruvian football league system

References

External links
 Fuerza Minera por el oro

Football clubs in Peru
Association football clubs established in 2010